Jordy Clasie (born 27 June 1991) is a Dutch professional footballer who plays as a midfielder for Eredivisie club AZ Alkmaar and for the Dutch national team.

Club career

Early career
Clasie arrived at the youth Feyenoord Academy (Varkenoord) as a 9-year-old in the summer of 2000 and progressed through the ranks to the Feyenoord / Excelsior U19s. In the summer of 2010 the Haarlem-born youngster went out on loan to Excelsior.

Clasie made his professional debut for Excelsior on 15 August 2010, when he was part of the starting line-up in the Rotterdam derby victory against Feyenoord (3–2).

Feyenoord

Clasie was brought into the first-team squad at Feyenoord at the start of the 2011–12 season and incoming coach Ronald Koeman immediately handed the youngster a place in the starting line-up. On 31 July 2011, he made his debut for Feyenoord in a friendly game against Málaga. Because of his good play and his tenacity he soon became one of the most popular players among the supporters.

On 29 August 2014, a day after Clasie helped Feyenoord qualify for the group stage of the UEFA Europa League, Clasie agreed to extend his contract until 2018. Clasie explained the decision that he was keen on developing himself as a player within the team as well as developing together with the team as a whole.

Southampton
However, on 15 July 2015, Clasie signed for Southampton on a five-year deal for a fee in the region of £8 million. This meant he would once again link up with Ronald Koeman who brought him into the Feyenoord first-team.

In the summer of 2016, Frenchman Claude Puel took over at the helm of Southampton. Clasie then scored his first goal for the club on 30 November 2016, in a 2–0 win over Arsenal in the EFL Cup.
Clasie's creativity was instrumental in Southampton getting to the League Cup final of 2017 where the Saints eventually emerged as runners up.

He scored his first Premier League goal on 8 April 2017 in a 1–0 victory at West Bromwich Albion.

Club Brugge
On 30 August 2017, Clasie joined Club Brugge on loan for the duration of the 2017–18 season.

Feyenoord
On 25 July 2018, the midfielder rejoined Feyenoord on loan for the duration of the 2018–19 season.

AZ Alkmaar
On 22 July 2019, Clasie signed a two-year contract for AZ Alkmaar, leaving Southampton on a free transfer.

International career
In November 2010, two months after his debut for Excelsior, he was selected for the Netherlands U21 squad. In February 2012, Bert van Marwijk, the coach of the first team of the Netherlands, pronounced his interest in Clasie. He was made aware that his name was on the stand-by list for Euro 2012.

Clasie was part of Louis van Gaal's 23-man squad for the 2014 FIFA World Cup in Brazil where the Dutch finished third beating the likes of defending champions Spain and hosts Brazil.
He made two appearances in the tournament, coming on as a substitute for Nigel de Jong in the semi-finals against Argentina and started the third place game against the hosts which the Dutch won 3–0 comfortably.

Playing style
As a combative midfielder with an eye for goal, Clasie's style of play has earned him the label of the "Dutch Xavi".

Career statistics

Club

International

Honours
Feyenoord
Johan Cruyff Shield: 2018

Southampton
EFL Cup runner-up: 2016–17

Club Brugge
Belgian Pro League: 2017–18

Netherlands
FIFA World Cup third place: 2014

References

External links

 
 
 
 Jordy Clasie at Voetbal International 
 

1991 births
Living people
Footballers from Haarlem
Dutch footballers
Netherlands youth international footballers
Netherlands under-21 international footballers
Netherlands international footballers
Association football midfielders
Excelsior Rotterdam players
Feyenoord players
Southampton F.C. players
Club Brugge KV players
AZ Alkmaar players
Eredivisie players
Premier League players
Belgian Pro League players
2014 FIFA World Cup players
Dutch expatriate footballers
Expatriate footballers in England
Expatriate footballers in Belgium
Dutch expatriate sportspeople in England
Dutch expatriate sportspeople in Belgium